npj Quantum Information is a peer-reviewed open-access scientific journal covering quantum information science, including quantum mechanical aspects of computing, communications, information theory, metrology, sensing, and cryptography. It is published by the Nature Publishing Group with Michelle Simmons (University of New South Wales) as founding editor-in-chief and was established in 2015. It was launched by Australian Education Minister Christopher Pyne.

Abstracting and indexing
The journal is abstracted and indexed in Current Contents/Physical Chemical and Earth Sciences, the Science Citation Index Expanded, and Scopus. According to the Journal Citation Reports, the journal has a 2020 impact factor of 7.385.

References

External links

Quantum mechanics journals
Publications established in 2015
Nature Research academic journals
Creative Commons Attribution-licensed journals
English-language journals
Continuous journals